The 2009 Trophée Éric Bompard was the first event of six in the 2009–10 ISU Grand Prix of Figure Skating, a senior-level international invitational competition series. It was held at the Palais Omnisports de Paris-Bercy in Paris on October 15–18. Medals were awarded in the disciplines of men's singles, ladies' singles, pair skating, and ice dancing. Skaters earned points toward qualifying for the 2009–10 Grand Prix Final. The compulsory dance was the Golden Waltz.

Results

Men

Ladies

Kim Yuna set a new free skating world record of 133.95 and a new combined total world record of 210.03.

Pairs

Ice dancing

External links

 
 
 
 

Trophée Éric Bompard, 2009
Internationaux de France
Trophée Éric Bompard
Figure
Trophée Éric Bompard
Trophée Éric Bompard
International figure skating competitions hosted by France